The 1921 Utah Agricultural Aggies football team was an American football team that represented Utah Agricultural College (later renamed Utah State University) in the Rocky Mountain Conference (RMC) during the 1921 college football season. In their third season under head coach Dick Romney, the Aggies compiled a 7–1 record (4–0 against RMC opponents), won RMC championship, and outscored all opponents by a total of 151 to 82.

Schedule

References

Utah Agricultural
Utah State Aggies football seasons
Rocky Mountain Athletic Conference football champion seasons
Utah Agricultural Aggies football